Świętochy is a village in the administrative district of Gmina Siennica, within Mińsk County, Masovian Voivodeship, in east-central Poland.

The village has an approximate population of 80.

References

Villages in Mińsk County